The Animals in That Country is a 2020 novel by Laura Jean McKay, published by Scribe. The novel won the Aurealis Award for Best Science Fiction Novel (2020), Arthur C. Clarke Award (2021), Victorian Prize for Literature (2021), and Victorian Premier's Prize for Fiction (2021).

In the novel, "A pandemic enables animals and humans to communicate," resulting "in a fierce and funny exploration of other consciousnesses and the limits of language."

Background 
The Animals in That Country was inspired by McKay's experiences of the chikungunya virus caught at a writer's festival in Bali in 2013. She had started working on the novel at that time; its eventual release at the start of COVID-19 pandemic was a coincidence. McKay said of her experiences recording the audiobook in March 2020:I had spent years concocting the most impossible virus, only to witness a disease beyond my imagination infecting, killing and driving the real world towards global isolation. It was a relief to get back into the booth and read the sections of the book where the animals start talking.The title is a homage to a 1968 poetry collection by Margaret Atwood.

Reception 
The Animals in That Country received a starred review from Shelf Awareness. Booklist said the novel is "not just a horror story ... but one filled with humor, optimism, and grace: a wild ride worth taking." The Guardian described it as an "extraordinary debut", and "a stirring attempt to inhabit other consciousnesses and a wry demonstration of the limits of our own language and empathy." 

The director of the Arthur C. Clarke Award said, "The novel speaks for the silent victims of our real-world climate crises, but while the environmental and social themes are deeply serious, our judges also praised the book's dark humour, sense of character and place, and its active opposition to easy genre tropes."

Slate named The Animals in That Country one of the top ten books of 2020. The Sunday Times selected it as one of the five best science-fiction books of the year.

References 

2020 Australian novels
English-language novels
Aurealis Award-winning works
Scribe (publisher) books